Arens is a surname. Notable people with the surname include:

Cody Arens (born 1993), American teen actor and voice actor
Egmont Arens (1889–1966), American publisher 
Henry M. Arens (1873-1963), American politician
Jan-Hein Arens (born 1974), Dutch painter
Logan Arens (born 1993), American actor and voice actor
Moshe Arens (1925-2019), Israeli politician
Richard Friedrich Arens (1919-2000), American mathematician

See also
Arends
Ahrens (disambiguation)
Ahrendt
Ahrendts